Coscinoptera is a genus of case-bearing leaf beetles in the family Chrysomelidae.

Selected species
 Coscinoptera aeneipennis (J. L. LeConte, 1858)
 Coscinoptera mucida (Say, 1837)
 Coscinoptera villosa (Jacoby, 1888)

References

Further reading

 
 
 

Clytrini
Articles created by Qbugbot
Chrysomelidae genera